Downtown Hartford, Connecticut is the primary business district and the center of Connecticut's state government.  Due to the large number of insurance companies headquartered downtown, Hartford is known as the "Insurance Capital of the World".

Business
Downtown Hartford is home to such corporations as The Hartford, Travelers Insurance, Hartford Steam Boiler, The Phoenix Companies, Aetna and United Technologies Corporation, most of which are housed in office towers constructed over the last 20–30 years. Downtown also serves as the hub for bus routes of Connecticut Transit Hartford. Union Station is located in the western part of downtown.

Downtown is also home to the Hartford City Hall, the Hartford Public Library, which is undergoing a major expansion and renovation, the Old State House, which is one of the oldest state houses in the nation, the Wadsworth Atheneum which is the oldest public art museum in the country, Travelers Tower, historic Hotel Bond, Bushnell Park, and the Connecticut State Capitol and Legislative Office Complex.

The south downtown area south of Bushnell Park is the site of several imposing buildings built in the early decades of the 20th century as the headquarters for large insurance companies. The Scottish Union and National Insurance Company building, in the Georgian Revival style, was built in 1913. The Renaissance Revival-style Connecticut General Life Insurance Company building, built in 1926, was inspired by the Medici-Riccardi Palace in Florence, Italy.

Education
Along Main Street, Capital Community College and the Hartford Public Schools offices are located in the 11-story building that until 1993 housed the G. Fox and Company department store. The newly renovated University of Connecticut School of Business is located at Constitution Plaza. At the eastern edge of downtown at Adriaens Landing the Connecticut Convention Center opened in June 2005 near the new Marriott Hartford Hotel.

Housing 
A major feature of the downtown and the city skyline is Hartford 21, a 36-story apartment tower completed in 2006. Starting in 2014 the 26-story office building at 777 Main Street (formerly the Bank of America Building) was converted into 285 luxury apartments.

Historic places
The downtown area includes eight historic districts listed on the National Register of Historic Places: the Ann Street Historic District, the Buckingham Square Historic District, the Department Store Historic District, the Downtown North Historic District, the Elm Street Historic District, the High Street Historic District, the Main Street Historic District No. 2, and the Pratt Street Historic District.

Pictures

See also
 Neighborhoods of Hartford, Connecticut
 List of tallest buildings in Hartford, Connecticut

References

External links 
 Downtown Neighborhood Data, Hartford Public Library website
 City Center: Downtown Hartford, Connecticut (map, photos, and descriptions)

Historic districts in Connecticut
Geography of Hartford, Connecticut
Hartford
Hartford